Scripbox (officially known as Scripbox.com India Private Limited) is a Bengaluru-based digital wealth management service founded in 2012.

History

Scripbox was founded by Atul Shinghal and Sanjiv Singhal, along with WS Ravishankar in Bengaluru, India, in 2012. The company has evolved to work in the wealth management space, with a presence across 2440+ cities in India.

In August 2019, Scripbox acquired Upwardly, a digital investment and advisory platform with a focus on mutual funds. During the time of the merger, Upwardly had assets under management (AUM) of Rs. 250 crore.

In July 2020, the company announced its foray into the international market for non-residential Indians (NRIs) specifically in the United Arab Emirates and Singapore.

In December 2020, Scripbox announced its strategic investment in Mitraz Financial, a SEBI registered investment advisor that had been providing personalised financial advisory services to high net worth individuals (HNIs) and ultra high net worth individuals (UHNIs). In 2022, Scripbox acquired the investment startup Wealth Managers for $21 million.

Financials
Scripbox raised over ₹200 crores in funding from Accel Partners, Omidyar Network, and other investors. Accel invested in series A, B, and C funding rounds, while Omidyar invested in series B and C.  Scripbox raised ₹151 crore from Accel, Omidyar, and NLI Strategic in its Series C round.

The Bengaluru-based firm raised ₹151 crore in its Series D round from multiple investors led by Accel Partners.

Scripbox has grown its assets under managemement (AUM) to Rs 12,000 Cr as of August, 2022.

Awards
Ranked 2nd Most Influential Financial Services Brand on LinkedIn in 2015.
Red Herring Asia 2016 ranked Scripbox amongst the year's most promising 100 private technology ventures in Asia.
The winner in FinTech category for FE-EY Best Banks Survey 2016–17.
FinTech Global has included Scripbox in WealthTech100, a list of the world's 100 most innovative companies
Founder and CEO, Atul Shinghal was named one of the Top 25 Financial Technology CEOs Of Asia For 2020 by The Financial Technology Report 
Founder and CEO, Atul Shinghal received the Entrepreneur of the Year in Service Business -  Financial award by Entrepreneur India in 2020

References

Financial services companies established in 2012
Financial services companies of India
Indian companies established in 2012
2012 establishments in Karnataka
Companies based in Bangalore